Laurent Jalabert (born 30 November 1968) is a French former professional road racing cyclist, from 1989 to 2002.

Affectionately known as "Jaja" (slang for a glass of wine; when he continued drinking wine as a professional, the nickname stuck because of the similarity to his name), he won many one-day and stage races and was ranked number 1 in the world in 1995, 1996, 1997 and 1999.

Although he never won the Tour de France, where he suffered altitude sickness, he won the Vuelta a España in 1995; as well as the leader's jersey, he won the sprinter's jersey and climber's jersey in the same race — only the third rider to have done this in a Grand Tour. With Alessandro Petacchi, Eddy Merckx, Djamolidine Abdoujaparov and Mark Cavendish, he is one of only five riders to win the points classification in all three grand tours.

Biography
He turned professional with the French Toshiba team in 1989 and quickly established himself as a daring sprinter. He moved on to the Spanish ONCE team under Manolo Saiz, where he reinvented himself as an all-rounder capable of winning one-day races and the tours.

A catalyst was an accident at the finish of the 1994 Tour de France stage in Armentières. A policeman leaned out and several riders hit him. Jalabert was flung into the air and his bicycle was destroyed. He injured his face and promised his wife to change his style of riding. It only took a short while.

He won the 1995 Vuelta a España along with the points and climbers' competitions. He won the world time trial championship in 1997, and was French road champion in 1998, the year he initiated a pull-out of Spanish teams from the 1998 Tour de France in protest at treatment of riders in a police inquiry into drug-taking. This caused discontent among French fans and it took years for them to warm to him. He moved to CSC in 2001, where he won the stage on 14 July, the French national day, Bastille Day, in the 2001 Tour de France. Earlier in the year he had injured his back in a domestic accident. He retired in 2002 after winning the mountains classification in the Tour de France and going on a solo escape in the Pyrenees.

Grand tours
He won several stages of the Tour de France, as a sprinter winning the points classification in the Tour de France twice and as a climber winning the mountains classification in the Tour de France twice. His wins on Bastille Day in Tour de France in 1995 and 2001 ensured him a place in the hearts of French fans.

In the 1990s he dominated Spanish stage races. Jalabert and Alex Zülle were a constant threat to other teams in the Vuelta a España, taking turns winning stages, the overall classification and the points jersey. The strength of ONCE, with domestiques such as Johan Bruyneel and Neil Stephens, meant they were able to keep a rein from start to finish.

Besides Eddy Merckx and Tony Rominger, Jalabert is the only cyclist who has accomplished the trifecta at the grand tour level in the 1995 Vuelta a España, where he won the general, sprinters' and climbers' classifications.

Jalabert is known for sporting generosity.  In the 1995 Vuelta he allowed Bert Dietz of Telekom — who had been in a solo breakaway for many kilometers — to take the mountaintop stage win at Sierra Nevada even though he had caught Dietz in the final kilometers.  "I never thought we'd catch him, and when I saw he was ready to drop I felt sorry for him. I wanted to show it's not true I'm trying to win it all.  My goal is the Tour of Spain," Jalabert said.

When the Vuelta was moved to September, Jalabert was finally able to compete in the spring classics and stage races such as Paris–Nice, winning many stages and the overall classification many times.

One-day races
His palmarès include Milan–San Remo in 1995 and the Giro di Lombardia in 1997. He also won La Flèche Wallonne in 1995 and 1997, and the Clásica de San Sebastián in 2001 and 2002. Absent from his palmares is the world cycling championship road race, although he was second in 1992 to Gianni Bugno of Italy. He also won an award as the most combative rider in the Tour de France in 2001 and 2002.

Retirement
On retirement, Jalabert was a consultant for Look cycles and contributed to a new line of bicycle frames. He is a commentator for France 2 and 3, the national television stations, often from a motorcycle alongside the race. In 2005, Jalabert ran the New York City marathon in 2h 55m 39s, coming 391st in a field of 36,894. He lives with his wife Sylvie and their children at Lafrançaise, near Montauban, south-west France. His brother Nicolas, who often raced with him, continued racing after Laurent's retirement.

Jalabert has also taken up triathlon. In January 2007, he competed at Ironman Switzerland and finished in 9 hours 12 minutes. He exited the water in 1:16, which put him 966th after the swim. Once on the bike he made up significant ground with a 4:39 bike split, which allowed him to climb to 91st overall at the run transition. A 3:11 marathon was enough to gain an additional 69 places and finish 22nd of 1,850 participants. After Switzerland he qualified for the Ironman World championship in Kona, Hawaii, finishing in 9:19 and 76th overall. In June, 2008, he finished 12th overall at Ironman France in Nice, improving his swim time to 1:06 and having the second fastest bike split.

On 11 March 2013 Jalabert was hit by a car while riding his bike near Montauban, France. When the ambulance arrived on the scene of the crash, he was found unconscious and with multiple fractures to his left arm and leg. That same year, Jalabert was summoned by the French senate for a testimony about doping. Jalabert never denied or confirmed that he had doped during his career: "I can’t firmly say that I’ve never taken anything illegal. I’ve effectively used products when it was necessary, in case of lesions or other injuries. At ONCE, in the evening after the stages, the doctor took care of us, for our recovery, but we didn’t really know what it was. A relationship with doctors based on mutual trust was established, so we didn’t ask questions." He also stated that after the Festina affair, he wanted to help his sport move in a new, cleaner direction.
In June 2013, it was reported in L'Équipe that retroactive tests performed in 2004 had found evidence of EPO use in samples provided by Jalabert in 1998. The re-tests were originally anonymous, but the Senate inquiry in 2013 has subsequently linked the tests to named riders. Because of these alligations on EPO usage Jalabert has been accused of hypocrisy in criticism of Chris Froome's performance in the 2015 Tour de France.

Career achievements

Major results

1988
 1st French Military Championships
 8th Overall Tour de l'Avenir
1989
 1st  Overall Tour d'Armorique
1st Stage 1 
 1st Stage 3 Tour du Limousin
 3rd Trofeo Luis Puig
 10th Grand Prix de Wallonie
1990
 1st  Overall Paris–Bourges
1st Stage 1 
 1st Stage 3 Circuit de la Sarthe
 2nd Clásica de San Sebastián
 2nd Philadelphia International Cycling Classic
 3rd Overall Tour de l'Avenir
 4th Overall Tour du Limousin
 4th Grand Prix de Wallonie
 5th Grand Prix d'Isbergues
 6th Overall Route du Sud
 6th Road race, UCI Road World Championships
 9th Grand Prix du Morbihan
1991
 2nd Overall Four Days of Dunkirk
1st Stage 2a
 2nd Overall Paris–Nice
 2nd UCI Road World Cup
 2nd Züri–Metzgete
 3rd Grand Prix de Cannes
 4th Overall Tour de l'Oise
 4th Clásica de San Sebastián
 6th Road race, National Road Championships
 7th Amstel Gold Race
 7th Paris–Tours
 7th Grand Prix de Fourmies
 8th Giro di Lombardia
 9th Tour of Flanders
 10th Overall Grand Prix du Midi Libre
 10th Grand Prix des Nations
1992
 Tour de France
1st  Points classification
1st Stage 6
 Volta a Catalunya
1st Stages 2, 5a & 7
 Vuelta a Burgos
1st  Points classification
1st Stages 3, 4 & 6
 1st Stage 3 Tour of the Basque Country
 1st Stage 3 Euskal Bizikleta
 2nd  Road race, UCI Road World Championships
 2nd Wincanton Classic
 3rd Trofeo Luis Puig
 4th Coppa Placci
 5th UCI Road World Cup
 5th Paris–Tours
 6th Grand Prix des Amériques
 7th Giro dell'Emilia
 8th Züri–Metzgete
 9th Milan–San Remo
1993
 1st  Overall Vuelta a La Rioja
1st Stages 2 & 3
 1st  Overall Vuelta a Mallorca
1st Stages 2, 3 & 4 
 Vuelta a España
1st Stages 3 & 7
 Volta a Catalunya
1st Stages 3 & 4
 1st Trofeo Luis Puig
 1st Clasica de Alcobendas
 1st GP de Toulouse
 1st Stage 8a Paris–Nice
 1st Stage 6 Volta a la Comunitat Valenciana
 1st Stage 3 Vuelta Asturias
 1st Stage 5 Vuelta a Castilla y León
 1st Stage 1 Tour of Galicia
 3rd Boucles de l'Aulne
 4th Milan–San Remo
 4th GP Ouest–France
 5th Trofeo Masferrer
 7th Gent–Wevelgem
 8th Overall Grand Prix du Midi Libre
 9th Liège–Bastogne–Liège
1994
 Vuelta a España
1st  Points classification
1st Stages 2, 3, 5, 12, 13, 16 & 21
 1st Stage 5 Grand Prix du Midi Libre
 1st Stage 5 Volta a Catalunya
 2nd Trofeo Luis Puig
 4th Road race, National Road Championships
 5th Giro del Piemonte
 7th Overall Tour of the Basque Country
1st Stage 2 
 8th Paris–Tours
 9th Overall Critérium International
 10th Milan–San Remo
1995
 1st  Overall Vuelta a España
1st  Points classification
1st  Mountains classification
1st Stages 3, 5, 8, 15, & 17
 1st  Overall Paris–Nice
1st Stage 2
 1st  Overall Volta a Catalunya
1st Stages 1 & 7
 1st  Overall Critérium International
1st Stages 1 & 2
 1st Milan–San Remo
 1st La Flèche Wallonne
 1st GP de Toulouse
 1st GP Amore-Bieta
 1st Stage 3 Grand Prix du Midi Libre
 2nd Overall Volta a la Comunitat Valenciana
1st Stage 2a
 4th Overall Tour de France
1st  Points classification
1st Stage 12
Held  after Stages 2–3
 4th Clásica de San Sebastián
 6th Wincanton Classic
1996
 Vuelta a España
1st  Points classification
1st Stages 3 & 13
 1st  Overall Paris–Nice
1st Stages 3 & 4
 1st  Overall Grand Prix du Midi Libre
1st Stages 2 & 5
 1st  Overall Route du Sud
 1st  Overall Volta a la Comunitat Valenciana
1st Stage 1
 1st Classique des Alpes
 1st Sète-Mont Saint-Clair
 1st Stage 1 Tour of the Basque Country
 2nd Overall French Road Cycling Cup
 3rd Milano–Torino
 5th Paris–Tours
 7th Road race, UCI Road World Championships
 9th Giro di Lombardia
 10th Clásica de San Sebastián
 10th Züri–Metzgete
1997
 1st  Time trial, UCI Road World Championships
 1st  Overall Paris–Nice
1st Stages 1 & 6
 1st  Overall Vuelta a Burgos
1st Stage 2
 1st  Overall Escalada a Montjuïc
 1st Stages 1a & 1b
 1st Giro di Lombardia
 1st La Flèche Wallonne
 1st Milano–Torino
 1st Route Adélie
 1st Vuelta a Mallorca
 2nd Overall Tour of the Basque Country
1st Stages 2 & 4
 2nd Liège–Bastogne–Liège
 5th UCI Road World Cup
 7th Overall Vuelta a España
1st  Points classification
1st Stages 6 & 20
 7th Amstel Gold Race
1998
 1st  Road race, National Road Championships
 1st  Overall Vuelta a Asturias
1st Stages 1 & 6
 Tour de Suisse
1st Prologue, Stages 3 & 8
 Tour of the Basque Country
1st Stages 1 & 5b
 1st Classique des Alpes
 1st Tour du Haut Var
 2nd Overall Paris–Nice
 2nd Liège–Bastogne–Liège
 5th Overall Vuelta a España
1999
 1st  Overall Tour de Romandie
1st Prologue, Stages 2 & 3b
 1st  Overall Tour of the Basque Country
1st Stage 1 & 5b
 1st  Overall Setmana Catalana de Ciclisme
1st Stage 5b
 1st Prueba Villafranca de Ordizia
 2nd Overall Tour de Suisse
1st Prologue
 4th Overall Giro d'Italia
1st  Points classification
1st Stages 4, 9 & 16
Held  after Stages 5–7 & 9–13
2000
 1st  Overall Setmana Catalana de Ciclisme
1st Stage 5b
 1st  Overall Tour Méditerranéen
1st Stage 5
 1st Stage 7 Critérium du Dauphiné Libéré
 1st Stage 3 Tirreno–Adriatico
 2nd GP Miguel Induráin
 3rd Overall Tour of the Basque Country
1st Stage 4 
 3rd La Flèche Wallonne
 5th Road race, Olympic Games
10th Liège–Bastogne–Liège
2001
 Tour de France
1st  Mountains classification
1st Stages 4 & 7
 Combativity award Overall
 1st Clásica de San Sebastián
 1st Polynormande
 2nd Overall Four Days of Dunkirk
2002
Tour de France
1st  Mountains classification
 Combativity award Overall
 1st Clásica de San Sebastián
 1st Coppa Ugo Agostoni
 1st Tour du Haut Var
 1st CSC Classic
 3rd Overall Paris–Nice
1st Stage 3
 3rd Memorial Rik Van Steenbergen

General classification results timeline

Classics results timeline

Awards
1st in (UCI) rankings: (1995, 1996, 1997 and 1999) (2nd in 1998)
Vélo d'Or international (1995) (2nd in 1997)
Vélo d'Or national (1992, 1995, 2002)
Mendrisio d'Oro (1995)

Ironman
22nd Ironman Switzerland (2007)
76th Ironman World Championship (2007)
12th Ironman France (2008)
376th Ironman World Championship (2018)

Doping
His name was on the list of doping tests published by the French Senate on 24 July 2013 that were collected during the 1998 Tour de France and found positive for EPO when retested in 2004.

References

External links

 

1968 births
Cycling announcers
Cyclists at the 1996 Summer Olympics
Cyclists at the 2000 Summer Olympics
French Tour de France stage winners
French Vuelta a España stage winners
French Giro d'Italia stage winners
French male cyclists
Living people
Olympic cyclists of France
People from Mazamet
Tour de Suisse stage winners
UCI Road World Champions (elite men)
Vuelta a España winners
Sportspeople from Tarn (department)
UCI Road World Rankings winners
Cyclists from Occitania (administrative region)
20th-century French people
21st-century French people